Tridrepana flava is a moth of the family Drepanidae. It is found in the north-eastern parts of the Himalaya, China, Taiwan, Sundaland, and Sulawesi.

The larvae feed on the leaves of Eurya japonica. Mature larvae curl a leaf margin and fix it with silk to pupate inside.

Subspecies
Tridrepana flava flava (India, north-eastern Himalaya, Taiwan, China: Jiangxi, Fujian, Guangdong, Hainan, Guangxi, Yunnan)
Tridrepana flava contracta Watson, 1957 (Sundaland)
Tridrepana flava unita Watson, 1957 (Sulawesi)

References

External links
The Moths of Borneo

Moths described in 1879
Drepaninae